Mikkel Jensen (born 31 December 1994) is a Danish racing driver.

Early career

Karting
Jensen began karting in 2010 and raced in his native Denmark for the majority of his career. He ended his karting career two years later, moving into single-seaters.

ADAC Formel Masters
2013 saw his debut in the ADAC Formel Masters championship with the Lotus-monikered Motopark Academy team. Jensen finished tenth in the championship with podiums at Spa and the Sachsenring.

Jensen remained in the series in 2014, moving to the Neuhauser Racing team. He achieved ten wins at Oschersleben, Zandvoort, Spielberg, the Slovakia Ring, the Nürburgring and Hockenheim on his way to the championship title.

FIA European Formula 3 Championship

In 2015, Jensen will graduate to the FIA European Formula 3 Championship, joining Mücke Motorsport.

Hypercar career
At the start of 2021, it was announced that Jensen would become part of the Peugeot Sport Le Mans Hypercar outfit for the 2022 WEC season. Partnering Paul di Resta and Jean-Éric Vergne, the team competed in the final three races of the campaign.

The following year, the trio of Jensen, di Resta and Vergne returned to the World Endurance Championship, driving the Peugeot 9X8.

Racing record

Career summary

† As Jensen was a guest driver, he was ineligible for championship points.

Complete FIA Formula 3 European Championship results
(key) (Races in bold indicate pole position) (Races in italics indicate fastest lap)

Complete European Le Mans Series results
(key) (Races in bold indicate pole position; results in italics indicate fastest lap)

Complete 24 Hours of Le Mans results

Complete IMSA SportsCar Championship results
(key) (Races in bold indicate pole position; results in italics indicate fastest lap)

† Points only counted towards the Michelin Endurance Cup, and not the overall LMP2 Championship.
* Season still in progress.

Complete FIA World Endurance Championship results

* Season still in progress.

References

External links
 
 

1994 births
Living people
Danish racing drivers
ADAC Formel Masters drivers
FIA Formula 3 European Championship drivers
Sportspeople from Aarhus
International GT Open drivers
European Le Mans Series drivers
24 Hours of Daytona drivers
24 Hours of Le Mans drivers
Blancpain Endurance Series drivers
ADAC GT Masters drivers
WeatherTech SportsCar Championship drivers
FIA World Endurance Championship drivers
Asian Le Mans Series drivers
Peugeot Sport drivers
Motopark Academy drivers
G-Drive Racing drivers
Mücke Motorsport drivers
Schnitzer Motorsport drivers
Neuhauser Racing drivers
Starworks Motorsport drivers
BMW M drivers
EuroInternational drivers
Rowe Racing drivers
TDS Racing drivers
AF Corse drivers
Nürburgring 24 Hours drivers
Mumbai Falcons drivers
Le Mans Cup drivers